"Young, Free and Single" is a single by German band Boney M., taken from their final album Eye Dance (1985). Only a modest hit, the single peaked at #49 in the German charts. Being a novelty record, the lyrics were about a radio talkshow for dating. Male dancer Bobby Farrell was featured in heavily disguised vocoder vocals in the verses while Reggie Tsiboe did the lead vocals on the chorus. The B-side Blue Beach was an instrumental dub version.

The 7" mix, although almost the same length as the album cut, differs from it, the opening ("welcome to the radio show...) being this of the 12" mix.

Releases
7" Singles
"Young, Free and Single" - 4:18 / "Blue Beach" (Farian) - 4:00 (Hansa 107 604-100, Germany)
"Young, Free and Single" - 4:18 / "Chica da Silva" (Farian, Reyam, Courage) - 4:35 (Carrere, UK)

12" Singles
"Young, Free and Single" (Club Mix) - 8:08 / "Blue Beach" - 4:00 (Hansa 601 839-213, Germany)
"Young, Free and Single" (Edited Club Mix) - 7:45 / "Blue Beach" - 4:00 (Ariola F-601 839, Spain)

Sources
 Rate Your Music, detailed discography
 
 [ Allmusic, biography, discography etc.]

1985 singles
Boney M. songs
Songs written by Frank Farian
Song recordings produced by Frank Farian
Hansa Records singles
1985 songs
Carrere Records singles